In mathematics and physics, a Hamiltonian vector field on a symplectic manifold is a vector field defined for any energy function or Hamiltonian. Named after the physicist and mathematician Sir William Rowan Hamilton, a Hamiltonian vector field is a geometric manifestation of Hamilton's equations in classical mechanics. The integral curves of a Hamiltonian vector field represent solutions to the equations of motion in the Hamiltonian form. The diffeomorphisms of a symplectic manifold arising from the flow of a Hamiltonian vector field are known as canonical transformations in physics and (Hamiltonian) symplectomorphisms in mathematics.

Hamiltonian vector fields can be defined more generally on an arbitrary Poisson manifold. The Lie bracket of two Hamiltonian vector fields corresponding to functions f and g on the manifold is itself a Hamiltonian vector field, with the Hamiltonian given by the
Poisson bracket of f and g.

Definition 
Suppose that  is a symplectic manifold. Since the symplectic form  is nondegenerate, it sets up a fiberwise-linear isomorphism

 

between the tangent bundle  and the cotangent bundle , with the inverse

 

Note: Some authors define the Hamiltonian vector field with the opposite sign. One has to be mindful of varying conventions in physical and mathematical literature.

Examples 
Suppose that  is a -dimensional symplectic manifold.

where  denotes the exterior derivative and  denotes the exterior product. Then the Hamiltonian vector field with Hamiltonian  takes the form: 

where  is a  square matrix

and

Suppose that M = R2n is the 2n-dimensional symplectic vector space with (global) canonical coordinates.

 If  then 
 if  then 
 if  then 
 if  then

Properties 
 The assignment  is linear, so that the sum of two Hamiltonian functions transforms into the sum of the corresponding Hamiltonian vector fields.
Then a curve  is an integral curve of the Hamiltonian vector field  if and only if it is a solution of Hamilton's equations: 

 The Hamiltonian  is constant along the integral curves, because . This property corresponds to the conservation of energy in Hamiltonian mechanics.
This fact is the abstract mathematical principle behind Noether's theorem.
 The symplectic form  is preserved by the Hamiltonian flow.  Equivalently, the Lie derivative

Poisson bracket
The notion of a Hamiltonian vector field leads to a skew-symmetric bilinear operation on the differentiable functions on a symplectic manifold M, the Poisson bracket, defined by the formula

where  denotes the Lie derivative along a vector field X. Moreover, one can check that the following identity holds: 

where the right hand side represents the Lie bracket of the Hamiltonian vector fields with Hamiltonians f and g. As a consequence (a proof at Poisson bracket), the Poisson bracket satisfies the Jacobi identity: 

Remarks

Notes

Works cited 

See section 3.2.

Hamiltonian mechanics
Symplectic geometry
William Rowan Hamilton